The National Trust is a Philadelphia soul, neo soul musical project  formed in 1999 in Chicago, Illinois.

History
While only officially formed in the late 1990s, The National Trust can trace its history back to 1990 through band leader, composer and guitarist Neil Rosario's previous bands Dolomite and Fifteen Couples.

After the breakup of Fifteen Couples in 1999, Rosario teamed up with Andy Cunningham (ex-Fifteen Couples guitarist), Doug Demers (ex-Dolomite bassist), vocalist/guitarist Mark Henning (ex-Zoom), and Bryan Aldrin. While still working on material the band signed with record label Thrill Jockey, which released their first song "Make It Happen". They then entered Chicago's Clava studios with producer Brian Deck to begin recording their debut album.

In June 2002, after Rosario returned to Chicago from his father's funeral in Las Vegas, he and Deck spent what has been reported as 500 hours in the studio putting the finishing touches to their debut album Dekkagar, which was released  on April 9, 2002.

The National Trust's second album Kings and Queens was released on January 24, 2006.

Discography

Dekkagar

The National Trust's debut album Dekkagar was released on April 9, 2002 by Thrill Jockey Records to generally positive reviews.

Track listing

Kings and Queens

Kings and Queens was The National Trust's second full-length album. It was released on January 24, 2006 by Thrill Jockey Records. While most reviews were favourable, most commented on the over production of the overall sound; Clearly, these boys can't grasp the concept of "say when" from Pitchfork Media. A majority of the tracks lack in everything but production value from Prefix Magazine.

Track listing

Television

The O.C.
Episode - "The Undertow"

The Gilmore Girls
Episode -

Road Rules

References

External links

The National Trust Myspace
The National Trust bio at Thrill Jockey Records

Musical groups from Chicago